Vinegar Hill is a 1994 novel by A. Manette Ansay. It was chosen as an Oprah's Book Club selection in November 1999.  It was adapted as a television film in 2005, starring Mary-Louise Parker and Tom Skerritt.

Plot introduction
When Ellen Grier and her family come back to Holly's Field, Wisconsin, it is not what they were hoping. Ellen's husband, James, has no job. The family have to move in with James's parents, Fritz and Mary-Margaret. These two dislike each other but dislike Ellen far more so far that she's on the brink of suicide.

References

1994 American novels
American novels adapted into films
Novels set in Wisconsin
Viking Press books
American novels adapted into television shows
1994 debut novels